In neuroscience, Golgi cells are inhibitory interneurons found within the granular layer of the cerebellum. They were first identified as inhibitory in 1964.
It was also the first example of an inhibitory feedback network, where the inhibitory interneuron was identified anatomically.
These cells synapse onto the dendrite of granule cells and unipolar brush cells. They receive excitatory input from mossy fibres, also synapsing on granule cells, and parallel fibers, which are long granule cell axons. Thereby this circuitry allows for feed-forward and feed-back inhibition of granule cells.

The main synapse made by these cells is a synapse onto the mossy fibre - granule cell excitatory synapse in a glomerulus. The glomerulus is made up of the mossy fibre terminal, granule cell dendrites, the Golgi terminal and is enclosed by a glial coat. 
The Golgi cell acts by altering the mossy fibre - granule cell synapse.

The Golgi cells use GABA as their neurotransmitter.  The basal level of GABA produces a postsynaptic leak conductance by tonically activating alpha 6-containing GABA-A receptors on the granule cell.
These high-affinity receptors are located both synaptically and extrasynaptically on the granule cell. The synaptic receptors mediate phasic contraction, duration of around 20-30ms whereas the extrasynapatic receptors mediate tonic inhibition of around 200ms, and are activated by synapse spill over.

Additionally the GABA acts on GABA-B receptors which are located presynaptically on the mossy fibre terminal. These inhibit the mossy fibre evoked EPSCs of the granule cell in a temperature and frequency dependent manner. At high mossy firing frequency (10 Hz) there is no effect of GABA acting on presynaptic GABA-B receptors on evoked EPSCs. However, at low (1 Hz) firing the GABA does have an effect on the EPSCs mediated via these presynaptic GABA-B receptors.

Golgi type I
A Golgi type I neuron has a long axon that begins in the grey matter of the central nervous system and may extend from there.
It is also known as a projection neuron. They include the neurons forming peripheral nerves and long tracts of brain and spinal cord.  Golgi II neurons, in contrast, are defined as having short axons or no axon at all. This distinction was introduced by the pioneering neuroanatomist Camillo Golgi, on the basis of the appearance under a microscope of neurons stained with the Golgi stain that he had invented. Santiago Ramón y Cajal postulated that higher developed animals had more Golgi type II in comparison to Golgi type I neurons. These Golgi type   II neurons have a star-like appearance, and are found in cerebral and cerebellar cortices and retina.

Golgi type II
A Golgi type II neuron either has no axon or else a short axon that does not send branches out of the gray matter of the central nervous system.

References

External links
 NIF Search - Golgi Cell via the Neuroscience Information Framework
 NIF Search - Golgi II Cell via the Neuroscience Information Framework

Central nervous system neurons
Cerebellum
Neurons